Enrique Pavón Pereyra (1921-2004) was a historian and Peronist politician known for biographical works on Juan Perón to whom he was very close. He was secretary of Juan Perón during his exile in Francoist Spain and served later as director of the National Library of the Argentine Republic.
He was also one of the founders of the Juan Domingo Perón Museum.

References

Argentine biographers
20th-century Argentine historians
Argentine male writers
Argentine librarians
Justicialist Party politicians
People from Santiago del Estero
1921 births
2004 deaths
Burials at La Chacarita Cemetery
Male non-fiction writers